Lachi (Urdu/) is one of the two tehsils in the Kohat District of Khyber Pakhtunkhwa province in Pakistan, located south of the district capital Kohat. The tehsil is subdivided into nine union councils. About 40% of the working population is employed outside the tehsil.It is a rural area where most households' livelihood depends on remittances and subsistence farming. Education is provided through several private and government high schools, as well as a government degree college affiliated with Kohat University.

Notable people
Afrasiab Khattak

References

Populated places in Kohat District